Augusto Marcaletti (born 2 August 1934) is a former Italian racing cyclist. He finished in last place in the 1962 Tour de France.

References

External links
 

1934 births
Living people
Italian male cyclists
Cyclists from the Province of Varese